Robert Clarke is a Northern Irish oncology researcher and academic administrator. He is the executive director of The Hormel Institute, a professor of biochemistry, Molecular Biology and Biophysics at the University of Minnesota, and ab Adjunct Professor of Oncology at Georgetown University.

With his work focused in breast cancer research, Clarke studies how hormones (endogenous and exogenous) and related factors affect breast cancer. He has authored over 340 publications, and has 5 patents awarded. His research primarily focuses on determining an individual patient’s prognosis and the likelihood that they will respond to specific systemic therapies. His laboratory also studies drug resistance and the role of cell-cell communication in affecting dormancy and responsiveness to endocrine therapies breast cancers that express the estrogen receptor.

Clarke is an elected Fellow of American Association for the Advancement of Science, the Royal Society of Chemistry, the Royal Society of Medicine, and the Royal Society of Biology. He is a Senior Editor for the journal Cancer Research.

Education
Clarke studied at the University of Ulster, and received his bachelor's degree in biological sciences in 1980. He then enrolled at Queen’s University of Belfast, and earned a M.Sc. in 1982, a Ph.D. in 1986, and a D.Sc. in 1999 (each in biochemistry). He completed his postdoctoral training at the Medical Breast Section of the National Cancer Institute in 1988.

Career
Following his postdoctoral training, Clarke joined Georgetown University School of Medicine as an assistant professor of physiology and biophysics, and was promoted to associate professor of oncology in 1995, and to professor in 1999. In 2020, he held an appointment at Georgetown University as an adjunct professor of oncology.

Clarke also held several administrative appointments in his career. He served as secretary/treasurer of the Georgetown University Senate from 2004 till 2007, as associate vice president of GUMC and director of Biomedical Graduate Research Organization from 2007 till 2019, as co-leader of Breast Cancer Program 2006 till 2020, and as dean for research 2011 till 2019 at Georgetown University. Since 2020 he serves as executive director of The Hormel Institute, University of Minnesota.

Research
Clarke's work is focused on how hormones (endogenous and exogenous) and related factors affect breast cancer. He initially focused on the interactions of hormones and anticancer drugs, and then expanded the work into studies of the underlying cellular and molecular mechanisms that explain how breast cancers become resistant to hormone and cytotoxic therapies. He and his colleagues have developed a series of hormone resistant breast cancer models that are now used in the field.

Breast cancer
Clarke’s research team and collaborators discovered a new signaling network and control mechanism that contributes to the hormonal regulation of breast cancer cell proliferation and cell death in response to estrogens, aromatase inhibitors, and antiestrogens This signaling includes communication between the endoplasmic reticulum and mitochondria, and reflects novel interactions within the unfolded protein response. His group has also identified interferon regulatory factor-1 as a breast cancer suppressor gene, and worked on the development and application of genomic and novel bioinformatic methods in translational breast cancer studies

Aspects of Acquired Endocrine Resistance in Breast Cancer
Clarke identified some of the first non-nuclear activities of endocrine therapies including the effects of Tamoxifen and high dose estrogens on membrane fluidity. In his studies regarding drug resistance and MDR1/P-glycoprotein, he published the first statistical meta-analysis of the role of MDR1 in breast cancer, and defined novel mechanisms of resistance to Taxanes. He was among the pioneers to implicate the unfolded protein response (UPR) in acquired endocrine resistance and in regulating involution in the normal mammary gland. In addition, his research team was among the first to implicate key BCL2 family members, interferon regulatory factor-1 and NFκB in the endocrine resistant phenotype, and to define basic interactions among the UPR, autophagy and apoptosis, regulation of immune markers, and the role for epigenetic changes in terms of determining trans-generational effects on endocrine responsiveness.

In his studies on the endocrine-mediated regulation of breast cancer progression and cell fate, he explored the concept that the final cell-fate decision is based on integrated signaling that flows through the endoplasmic reticulum, mitochondria and nucleus. Together, this signaling is represented in a modular network that regulates and executes five key  cell function modules (autophagy, cell death, metabolism, proliferation, and UPR).

Awards and honors
2012 - Sigma Xi Distinguished Lecturer, National Cancer Institute 
2019 - Fellow, the American Association for the Advancement of Science

Bibliography
Clarke, R., Brünner, N., Katzenellenbogen, B.S., Thompson E.W., Norman, M.J., Koppi, C., Paik, S., Lippman, M.E. & Dickson, R.B. (1989). Progression from hormone dependent to hormone independent growth in MCF-7 human breast cancer cells. Proceedings of the National Academy of Sciences USA, 86(10), 3649–3653.
Trock, B. J., Leonessa, F., & Clarke, R. (1997). Multidrug resistance in breast cancer: a meta-analysis of MDR1/gp170 expression and its possible functional significance. Journal of the National Cancer Institute, 89(13), 917–931.
Trock, B. J., Hilakivi-Clarke, L., & Clarke, R. (2006). Meta-analysis of soy intake and breast cancer risk. Journal of the National Cancer Institute, 98(7), 459–471.
Clarke, R., Ressom, H. W., Wang, A., Xuan, J., Liu, M. C., Gehan, E. A., & Wang, Y. (2008). The properties of high-dimensional data spaces: implications for exploring gene and protein expression data. Nature Reviews Cancer, 8(1), 37–49.
Tyson, J.J., Baumann, W.T., Chen, C., Verdugo, A., Tavassoly, I., Wang, Y., Weiner, L.M. & Clarke, R. (2011). Dynamic modelling of estrogen signaling and cell fate in breast cancer cells. Nature Reviews Cancer, 11(7): 523–532.

References

Living people
People from Northern Ireland
Georgetown University faculty
University of Minnesota faculty
British oncologists
Academic administrators
Year of birth missing (living people)
Alumni of Queen's University Belfast
Alumni of Ulster University